Harold 'Harry' Wood (28 November 1902 – 27 June 1975) was a British long-distance runner.

Athletics career
He competed in the marathon at the 1928 Summer Olympics.

He also competed for England in the marathon at the 1934 British Empire Games in London.

Personal life
Wood was a miner by trade.

References

1902 births
1975 deaths
Athletes (track and field) at the 1928 Summer Olympics
Athletes (track and field) at the 1934 British Empire Games
British male long-distance runners
British male marathon runners
Olympic athletes of Great Britain
Sportspeople from Wigan
Commonwealth Games competitors for England